Aiton is a surname of Scottish origin. Notable people with the surname include:

George Aiton, Major League Baseball player
John Aiton, Scottish religious writer
Paul Aiton, Papua New Guinean rugby league player
William Aiton (1731–1793), Scottish botanist for whom the standard author abbreviation "Aiton" is used when citing a botanical name
William Townsend Aiton (1766–1849), Scottish botanist; William Aiton's son
William Aiton (sheriff), Scottish law agent

See also
Ayton (surname)
Aytoun, several biographies

References

Surnames of Scottish origin